The Uganda cricket team toured Namibia in April 2022 to play three Twenty20 International (T20I) matches and two 50-over matches. The venue for all of the matches was the United Ground in Windhoek. The tour was a repeat of Uganda's visit in April 2021, when Namibia swept both the T20I series and the 50-over series. Ahead of the matches against Uganda, the Namibians hosted Ireland Wolves for a three-match Twenty20 series (winning 2–1) and a five-match List A 50-over series (drawn 2–2).

Namibia won the first T20I by 8 wickets. In the second game, Namibian captain Gerhard Erasmus scored an unbeaten century and dismissed both Ugandan opening batters, but an unbeaten partnership of 118 runs between Dinesh Nakrani and Riazat Ali Shah lead Uganda to a seven-wicket victory. Namibia won the third T20I match by 52 runs, following an all-round performance from JJ Smit, to take the series 2–1. Smit scored a half-century, then took a five-wicket haul which included a hat-trick.

Namibia cruised to victory in the first 50-over game after dismissing the visitors for only 68 runs. However, Uganda levelled the series with a thrilling run-chase in the second game.

Squads

 
Karl Birkenstock, Salomon Nuuyoma and Louis Peters also featured for Namibia in the 50-over series.

T20I series

1st T20I

2nd T20I

3rd T20I

50-over series

1st 50-over match

2nd 50-over match

References

External links
 Series home at ESPN Cricinfo

Associate international cricket competitions in 2021–22